The Temple of Al-Lat, was an ancient temple located in Palmyra, Syria dedicated to the goddess Al-Lat.

The temple was dedicated by the citizen Taimarsu of Palmyra in c. 123–164 A.D.  
The cult statue was made with an appearance similar to statues of the Greek goddess Athena in Athens.   This would be in line with the fact that the Arabian goddess Al-Lat, in the interpretatio graeca customary at the time, was identified with the Hellenistic goddess Athena. 
 
The temple was closed during the persecution of pagans in the late Roman Empire in a campaign made by Maternus Cynegius, Praetorian prefect of the East, between 25 May 385 to 19 March 388, when the altar of the temple was destroyed and the cult statue of Allat-Athena was decapitated and had the center of its face crushed.   Votive gifts of Roman Bronze coins from c. 364–375 and 376–386 illustrate that the sanctuary was still in use at the time of its destruction.   
In contrast to other temples in Palmyra, the temple of Al-Lat was not converted to a church, but left to decay.    

Only a podium, a few columns, and the door frame remain. Inside the compound, a giant lion relief –(Lion of Al-lāt) was excavated and, in its original form, was a relief protruding from the temple compound's wall.

Gallery

References

Citations

Sources

2nd-century establishments in the Roman Empire
2nd-century religious buildings and structures
Buildings and structures demolished in the 4th century
380s disestablishments in the Roman Empire
Buildings and structures in Palmyra
Destroyed temples
Former religious buildings and structures in Syria
123
Buildings and structures completed in the 2nd century
Persecution of pagans in the late Roman Empire
Al-Lat
Al-Lat